The Face at the Window may refer to:

The Face at the Window (play), a stage play by F. Brooke Warren
The Face at the Window (1910 film)
The Face at the Window (1912 film)
The Face at the Window (1913 film)
The Face at the Window (1914 film)
The Face at the Window (1915 film)
The Face at the Window (1919 film), based on the 1897 play
The Face at the Window (1920 film), based on the 1897 play
The Face at the Window (1932 film), a British film directed by Leslie S. Hiscott, based on the 1897 play
The Face at the Window (1939 film), based on the 1897 play
The Face at the Window (1998 film)
The Face at the Window (2004 film)